Logan Martin Lake is a reservoir located in east central Alabama on the Coosa River approximately  east of Birmingham, Alabama. This  reservoir was built in 1965 by Alabama Power Company. The lake, nicknamed Lake of a Thousand Coves by locals, has  of shoreline along its  length sandwiched between Logan Martin Dam on the south and Neely Henry Dam on the north.

The lake borders St. Clair and Talladega counties. The reservoir extends  from Logan Martin Dam upstream to Neely Henry Dam, and it contains .

Alabama has a lake of a similar name, the Lake Martin on the Tallapoosa River, but Lake Martin and Logan Martin Lake are not part of the same river system.

Hydrology
Logan Martin Lake begins at the discharge of Neely Henry Dam near Ohatchee, Alabama (near the site of former Coosa River Lock 3) and extends south to Logan Martin Dam near Vincent, Alabama. The Coosa River is the primary inflow for the lake, in addition to numerous lakes and rivers. Prevailing flow is from the north to the south along a meandering course. The Coosa River arises in the Appalachian Mountains and its waters, and those of Logan Martin Lake, eventually discharge into Mobile Bay and the Gulf of Mexico through the Alabama River and Mobile River. The Lake is largely a run-of-the-river reservoir through its upper reaches. From the location of Lock 4 to the I-20 bridge, the river expands, but is still largely confined to the original course of the Coosa River and the immediate mouths of tributary streams rather than spreading over the floodplain like a typical reservoir. From the I-20 bridge in the Riverside area to the Logan Martin Dam (approximately 23 miles), the lake expands to a width much greater than the original river channel, with large areas of open water and many medium to large sized sloughs and creeks.

Geology
Logan Martin Lake is situated in the Northern Piedmont physiographic province of Alabama, characterized by generally low ridges at the very southern reach of the Appalachian Mountains. The reservoir lies primarily within the Ordovician Knox Group (OCk).

Wildlife
Numerous aquatic species make their home in Logan Martin Lake with game and non-game fish being the dominant interest for human use. Numerous local and national fishing tournaments are held on the lake annually, the lake has also hosted championship events of the FLW Outdoors Tour and the Bassmaster Classic in 1992, 1993, and 1997. Large numbers of both largemouth and spotted bass inhabit the lake, as well as striped bass, white bass, hybrid bass, crappie, catfish (mostly of the channel variety), bream, drum, carp, and gar. Fish in Logan Martin lake are polluted with, in some cases, substantial amounts of Polychlorinated biphenyls (PCBs), originating from Choccolocco Creek, and ultimately Anniston, Alabama.  The pollution culminated with several high-profile class action lawsuits in the early 2000s, one of which was led by attorney Johnnie Cochran.

History
The Coosa River was long used for steamship navigation as far north as Rome, Georgia. An extensive series of locks allowed passage along shoals and ledges in the river. After steamships were replaced by roads and railroads, the site of proposed Lock 7 was selected for a large dam to provide hydropower, flood control, and recreation. Construction started on the gravity concrete and earth fill dam July 18, 1960 and it was placed in service August 10, 1964. Logan Martin Dam is named after William Logan Martin, Jr., a judge and Attorney General in Alabama in the early 20th century.

Economy
Logan Martin Lake contributes millions of dollars annually to the communities surrounding the lake in the form of increased property values, expenditures by recreational visitors at local businesses, and low-cost hydropower for the state. Its proximity to the large population center of Birmingham leads to heavy use by recreational boaters during the summer, and it is also used for skiing and swimming.. The vast majority of the boat traffic is between I-20 and Logan Martin Dam, with the traffic increasing in the more open areas surrounding the Logan Martin Dam.

References

http://www.dailyhome.com/news/2008/dh-localnews-0412-datchison-8d11v3715.htm
http://www.clantonadvertiser.com/articles/2008/04/04/sports/a-sports.txt
Anniston Star, AL - Apr 20, 2008

External links
Hunting, fishing, Outdoor
Outdoor Alabama Logan Martin Link
General Information
Logan Martin Lake Protection Association
Logan Martin Information and News Website
Alabama Lakes Logan Martin Link
 Coosa / Warrior Relicensing Project; Initial Information Package for the Logan Martin Development; FERC 2146
Alabama Power Company; Coosa Project

Landmarks in Alabama
Reservoirs in Alabama
Dams in Alabama
Alabama Power dams
Dams completed in 1964
Bodies of water of Calhoun County, Alabama
Bodies of water of St. Clair County, Alabama
Bodies of water of Talladega County, Alabama
1964 establishments in Alabama